The Basic Amino Acid Antiporter (ArcD) family (TC# 2.A.118) is a constituent of the IT superfamily. This family consists of proteins from Gram-negative and Gram-positive bacteria (e.g., Streptococcus, Escherichia, Salmonella, Fusobacterium and Borrelia species). The proteins are of about 480 amino acyl residues (aas) in length and have 10-12 putative transmembrane segments (TMSs). Functionally characterized homologues are in the DcuC (TC #2.A.61) and ArsB (TC #2.A.4) families. Some members of the family probably catalyze arginine/ornithine or citrulline/ornithine antiport.

See also 
 Ion transporter superfamily
 Amino acid transporters
 DcuC
 ArsB and ArsAB
 Transporter Classification Database

References 

Protein families
Membrane proteins
Transmembrane proteins
Transmembrane transporters
Transport proteins
Integral membrane proteins